Loch Hoil is a small freshwater lochan located between the shallow hills between Strath Braan and Strath Tay valley's in Perth and Kinross.

See also
 List of lochs in Scotland

Gallery

References

Freshwater lochs of Scotland
Lochs of Perth and Kinross
Tay catchment
Birdwatching sites in Scotland